Hatsue Nagakubo-Takamizawa (born 27 July 1935) is a Japanese speed skater. She competed at the 1960 Winter Olympics and the 1964 Winter Olympics.

References

External links
 

1935 births
Living people
Japanese female speed skaters
Olympic speed skaters of Japan
Speed skaters at the 1960 Winter Olympics
Speed skaters at the 1964 Winter Olympics
Sportspeople from Nagano Prefecture
20th-century Japanese women